A Lion Among Men is a fantasy novel by American writer Gregory Maguire, the third book in his The Wicked Years series. It was released in the UK on October 2, 2008, October 8 in the US, and on October 14, 2008 in the rest of Europe.

Prior to the publication of A Lion Among Men, Maguire stated that "this book will be about the differing moralities... among soldiers, for one, and diplomats, for another... about decisions to wage war" and "One of the main characters is the Cowardly Lion". Maguire also stated that the novel's story "starts off about eight years after the end of Son of a Witch". Maguire's website describes the novels as "seen now through the eyes of the Cowardly Lion—the once tiny cub defended by Elphaba in Wicked: The Life and Times of the Wicked Witch of the West."

Synopsis

The story opens with an impending battle between the Munchkinlanders and the Emerald City (EC) troops. In the middle of the warzone is the Mauntery which has been a haven for Elphaba, Yackle, Liir, and Candle. Yackle still lives despite losing her eyesight, and longs for death. At her request, the Maunts bury her in their crypt alive with only a few candles and some wine. She is eventually forgotten, but not by all.
   
Elsewhere, a young woman wanders the Land of Oz until her path crosses "the dwarf", whom she calls Mr. Boss, the caretaker of the Clock of the Time Dragon. The Clock has awakened...

Back at the Mauntery, Brrr, the Cowardly Lion, and his pet, a Glass Cat that he has nicknamed Shadowpuppet, arrive looking for Yackle. The Maunts claim she is deceased but Yackle rises from the crypt, still alive. Yackle and Brrr begin a game of wits – Brrr demands information on Madame Morrible and in exchange he will tell Yackle about himself.

Brrr does not remember his parents or where he is from. He grew up by himself in the Great Gillikin Forest, learning language from the hunters that travel through his forest. One day he meets a soldier, Jemmsy, who's caught in his own hunting trap that was supposed to catch Animals. He implores Brrr to go to Tenniken and get help. Instead, out of fear and the naive belief that since this is the first person he has conversed with, then Jemmsy's a friend and cannot be abandoned, Brrr stays with Jemmsy until he dies, claiming the books that lie beside him and taking Jemmsy's medal for courage to give to Jemmsy's relatives. Thus begins the Lion's unhappy personage as a coward.

After Jemmsy dies, Brrr goes out to find Tenniken. Not long after he sets out, Brrr finds a terrified Bear Cub. The Bear soon reveals that his name is Cubbins, and takes Brrr to his family. They're the Northern Bears under rule by Queen Ursaless. She tells Brrr that to get to Tenniken, he must travel through the Cloud Swamp, a wet land inhabited by the Ozmists (ghost-like beings). Brrr and Cubbins have an "all but fatal" interview with the Ozmists. Brrr soon leaves Cubbins with the pile of books as he leaves the Great Gillikin Forest for the first time.

When Brrr first ventures out of the forest, he finds out he is not in Tenniken at all, but Traum, a market town east of Tenniken. Brrr soon finds himself involved in a massacre of Glikkun trolls. Not knowing what to do, Brrr tells some trolls to play dead, as he thinks that it is the only way to bypass the slaughter, but they take his advice too late and become captured. The people of Traum celebrate the Lion for refusing to help their enemies, the Glikkuns, and Brrr safely gets out of Traum by train. While on the train, however, Brrr decides that his refusal to help the Glikkuns is really a badge of shame, and knowing that in Tenniken his reputation will precede him, he ultimately cannot bring himself to go there, instead arriving in the University town of Shiz.

Brrr sets himself up in an apartment, and spends time in and around Shiz. The Lion soon finds a poem dedicated to humiliating him. Feeling embarrassed, Brrr packs up and leaves into the wilderness. Brrr wanders around the woods aimlessly for a while, until he finds a pride of Lions trying to make it in the forest. Brrr lives with the Lions for several years. But some of the Lions mock him, prompting him to leave again.

The next group that Brrr encounters is the Ghullim, a streak of Ivory Tigers in Wend Fallows. He'd happily pass right through their tribe without stopping, but they force him to stay with them for a while, if only to assess his status as a threat. While there, he befriends and ultimately falls in love with Muhlama H'aekeem, princess and heir to the Chieftaincy of the Ghullim. But when they're discovered mating by Ivory Tiger scouts, her father Chief Uyodor H'aekeem announces that he suspects him of attempting to thwart his regime due to Muhlama being seriously wounded from the lovemaking, once again prompting him to leave, before they have his head on a trophy background.

Within the following weeks, Brrr meets a strange group of travelers. One a little girl named Dorothy, one a Scarecrow and the other was Nick Chopper, the Tin Woodman. Brrr decides to go with them to meet the Wizard of Oz. They soon find themselves on a quest to kill Elphaba, the Wicked Witch of the West. But Dorothy wants to reason with her instead. Once at Kiamo Ko, where Elphaba lives, she locks the Lion in a room with Liir while she and Dorothy have at it. They soon break out in time for Elphaba to be vanquished. The five go back to the Wizard and get their rewards. All but Brrr got what they wanted (Brrr getting a terribly manufactured Badge of Courage, even more so than Jemmsy's. Liir gets nothing for he was left outside.) Brrr promises Dorothy that he will protect and look after Liir, but Liir vanishes in the streets and crowds of the Emerald City. Brrr then goes off on his own path, like before.

The Lion has hit the outback again. With the other members of Dorothy's party laughing it up and having their own affairs, Brrr soon meets two old bachelors; Mister Mikko, an Ape, and Professor Lenx, a Boar of some kind. The three Animals discuss current events and past events. They soon rile Brrr up to retrieve money from the banks of Oz for them. The Lion soon becomes a broker for Animals, retrieving their money that is held in the banks since before they were forced to leave Oz. The forces of Oz soon discover that Brrr is bringing money into the Free State of Munchkinland and try him for being a Collaborationist. He strikes a plea and is assigned to go find the whereabouts of the Grimmerie, which leads him to his interview with Yackle.

This recaps the first part of the book.

Characters

References

2008 American novels
2008 fantasy novels
Novels by Gregory Maguire
Oz (franchise) books
Sequel novels
The Wicked Years
Novels based on fairy tales
Books about lions